Tirhugh is a barony in County Donegal, Republic of Ireland. Baronies were mainly cadastral rather than administrative units. They acquired modest local taxation and spending functions in the 19th century before being superseded by the Local Government (Ireland) Act 1898.

Etymology
Tirhugh takes its name from the Irish Tír Aodha, meaning "Aodh's land", referring to Áed mac Ainmuirech, a semi-legendary 6th century king. The Irish name Áed (Aodh) is conventionally translated as Hugh, although the names are etymologically unrelated.

Geography

Tirhugh is located in the south of County Donegal, on the River Erne and the east coast of Donegal Bay. It is the strip of land that connects Donegal to the rest of the Republic of Ireland.

History

The territory of the O'Gallchobair (Gallagher) was centered here from the Middle Ages onward. The Mac Raith, O'Haedha (O'Hugh or Hayes), MacDonlevy, MacNulty, O'Clery, MacWard, O'Lynch and O'Mullhollan were other local septs.

The Annals of the Four Masters mention Tirhugh several times:

The name "Tirhugh" is used today for the Tirhugh Resource Centre, Ballyshannon, for the local unemployed.

List of settlements

Below is a list of settlements in Tirhugh:

Ballintra
Ballyshannon
Bundoran
Donegal
Laghy
Pettigo

References

Baronies of County Donegal